"Alone + Easy Target" is  a US radio only single released by Foo Fighters from their self-titled debut album. It was released only as a promotional single.

Song history
Dave Grohl wrote and recorded the song in its original form in 1991. Grohl played the demo of the song for Nirvana band-mate Kurt Cobain in a break between touring for the album Nevermind. According to Grohl, "I'd told him I was recording and he said, 'Oh, I wanna hear it, bring it by.' He was sitting in the bath-tub with a walkman on, listening to the song, and when the tape ended, he took the headphones off and kissed me and said, 'Oh, finally, now I don't have to be the only songwriter in the band!' I said, 'No, no, no, I think we're doing just fine with your songs.'" Nirvana would jam the song on soundchecks during the Europe 1991 tour.

Live performance
The song was a setlist staple from 1995 to 2000. It disappeared afterward and wasn't played again until the Echoes, Silence, Patience & Grace tour in 2007, where it was played twice. The song would not be played again until 2012 on the Wasting Light tour, where it was again played twice. The song was also played twice on the Sonic Highways tour in 2015. It was most recently played at a secret show in 2018.

Track list
US promo single
"Alone + Easy Target" (album version)

Accolades

Recording and release history

Studio versions

References

1996 singles
Foo Fighters songs
Songs written by Dave Grohl
1995 songs
Capitol Records singles